Amelia Rosselli (28 March 1930 – 11 February 1996) was an Italian poet. She was the daughter of Marion Catherine Cave, an English political activist, and Carlo Rosselli, who was a hero of the Italian anti-Fascist Resistance—founder, with his brother Nello, of the liberal socialist movement "Justice and Liberty."

He and his brother were assassinated by La Cagoule, secret services of the Fascist regime, while the extended family was living in exile in France in 1937. The family then moved between England and the United States, where Rosselli was educated. She continued to speak Italian with her grandmother, Amelia Pincherle Rosselli, a Venetian Jewish feminist, playwright, and translator from a family prominent in the Italian Risorgimento, the movement for independence. Rosselli returned to Italy in 1949, eventually settling in Rome.

She spent her life studying composition, music, and ethnomusicology and taking part in the cultural life of postwar Italy as a poet and literary translator. Her extraordinary, highly experimental literary output includes verse and poetic prose in English and French as well as Italian. She committed suicide in 1996 by jumping from her fifth floor apartment near Rome's Piazza Navona.

Rosselli has been translated into English by Lucia Re, Jennifer Scappettone, Gian Maria Annovi, Diana Thow, Deborah Woodard, Paul Vangelisti, and Cristina Viti.

Poetry collections in English

Sonno - Sleep (1953-1966), bilingual edition, translated into Italian by Antonio Porta. Roma: Rossi & Spera, 1989.
Sleep: Poesie in Inglese, bilingual edition, translated into Italian by Emmanuela Tandello. Milano: Garzanti, 1992
October Elizabethans, bilingual edition, edited and translated into Italian by Emmanuela Tandello. Genova: San Marco dei Giustiniani, 2015 (posthumous)

Poetry collections in Italian
Variazioni belliche. Milano: Garzanti, 1964 (War Variations, translated by Lucia Re and Paul Vangelisti. Green Integer, 2003)
Serie ospedaliera. Milano: Il Saggiatore, 1969 (Hospital Series, translated by Deborah Woodard, Roberta Antognini, Giuseppe Leporace. New Directions, 2015)
Documento (1966-1973). Milano: Garzanti, 1976
Primi scritti 1952-1963. Milano: Guanda, 1980
Impromptu. Genova: Edizioni San Marco dei Giustiniani, 1981 (Impromptu. A Trilingual Edition, translated by Gian Maria Annovi, Diana Thow, Jean-Charles Vegliante. Guernica, 2015)
Appunti sparsi e persi, 1966-1977: Poesie. Reggio Emilia: Aelia Laelia, 1983
La libellula. Milano: SE, 1985
Antologia poetica. Milano: Garzanti, 1987
Le poesie. Milano: Garzanti, 1997
Appunti sparsi e persi: 1966-1977.  Roma: Empiria, 1997 (posthumous)
La furia dei venti contrari. Variazioni: Con testi inediti e dispersi dell'autrice, Firenze, Le lettere, 2007 (posthumous)
La libellula e altri scritti, Milano, SE, 2010 (posthumous) (The Dragonfly: A Selection of Poems: 1953-1981, translated by Giuseppe Leporace & Deborah Woodard. Chelsea Editions, 2010)
 L'opera poetica, edited by Stefano Giovannuzzi. Milano: "I Meridiani" Mondadori, 2012 (posthumous)

Selected poetry originally written in English or Italian
Locomotrix: Selected Poetry and Prose of Amelia Rosselli, edited and translated by Jennifer Scappettone. Chicago: University of Chicago Press, 2012) (posthumous)

Creative prose
Prime prose italiane (1954)
Nota (1967–1968)
Diario ottuso. 1954-1968. Roma: IBN, 1990 (Obtuse Diary, translated by Deborah Woodard, Roberta Antognini, Dario De Pasquale. Entre Ríos Books, 2018)

Critical writings
Una scrittura plurale: Saggi e interventi critici, edited by Francesca Caputo. Novara: Interlinea, 2004 (posthumous)

References
 

1930 births
1996 suicides
Gruppo 63
Suicides by jumping in Italy
Writers from Paris
Jewish Italian writers
Jewish poets
20th-century Italian Jews
20th-century Italian poets
Burials in the Protestant Cemetery, Rome
People with Parkinson's disease
20th-century Italian women writers
Italian women poets